Ajay Singh Chautala (born 13 March 1961) is a former Indian MP and sports administrator. He is elder son of former Chief Minister of Haryana Om Prakash Chautala and father of current Deputy Chief Minister of Haryana Dushyant Chautala.

Biography 

Ajay Singh Chautala is a son of Om Prakash Chautala, a former Chief Minister of Haryana, and a grandson of Chaudhary Devi Lal, a former deputy prime minister of India. He has two sons Dushyant Chautala, incumbent deputy chief minister of Haryana  (youngest MP, Hisar Haryana 16th Lok Sabha) and Digvijay Chautala (national President N INSO). He did his B.A. from Kurukshetra University, M.A. (Public Administration) and LL.B. from Rajasthan University. He entered active politics in 1980s, became MLA from Rajasthan twice: first from Data Ram Garh (1989) and then from Nohar (1993).

Ajay became MP, Lok Sabha from Bhiwani in 1999. He then became MP, Rajya Sabha from Haryana in 2004. He then became MLA from Dabwali in 2009.

Later Ajay Singh's wife Naina Singh Chautala became MLA from Dabwali In 2014. Their son Dushyant Chautala was MP, Lok Sabha from Hisar from 2014 to 2019.

Conviction in Recruitment scam 

In June 2008 Chautala and 53 others were charged in connection with the appointment of 3,206 junior basic teachers in the state of Haryana during 1999 and 2000. In January 2013 a New Delhi court sentenced Chautala and his father Om Prakash Chautala to ten years' imprisonment under various provisions of the IPC and the Prevention of Corruption Act. Chautala was found guilty of illegally recruiting over 3,000 teachers. A CBI investigation was ordered by the Supreme Court based on a writ filed by former director of primary education Sanjeev Kumar, a 1989 batch IAS officer.

His and his father's sentences have been upheld by the Delhi High Court and the Supreme Court.

See also
 Devi Lal
 Dynastic politics of Haryana
 Dushyant Chautala

References 
14 Jannayak Janata Party: Ajay Chautala faction unveils new party
The Indian Express. 10 December 2018.

External links
Ajay Singh Chautala

Living people
1961 births
People from Sirsa, Haryana
Rajya Sabha members from Haryana
University of Rajasthan alumni
Kurukshetra University alumni
India MPs 1999–2004
Lok Sabha members from Haryana
Indian National Lok Dal politicians
Haryana MLAs 2009–2014
Indian politicians convicted of crimes
Ajay
Criminals from Haryana
Corruption in Haryana
Jannayak Janta Party politicians